al-Jarushiya is a Palestinian village in the Tulkarm Governorate in the western West Bank, located 6 kilometers North of Tulkarm. According to the Palestinian Central Bureau of Statistics, al Jarushiya had a population of approximately 907 inhabitants in mid-year 2006. 8.4% of the population of al-Jarushiya were refugees in 1997. The healthcare facilities for the surrounding villages are based in al-Jarushiya, the facilities are designated as MOH level 2.

History
In 1961, under  Jordanian rule, the population of Jarushiya was  245.

Post 1967
After the Six-Day War in 1967, Al-Jarushiya came under Israeli occupation.

Footnotes

Bibliography

External links
Welcome To al-Jaroushiyya
Survey of Western Palestine, Map 11:    IAA, Wikimedia commons

Villages in the West Bank
Tulkarm Governorate
Municipalities of the State of Palestine